Nothotalisia is a genus of flowering plants belonging to the family Picramniaceae.

Its native range is Panama to Bolivia and Northern Brazil.

Species:

Nothotalisia cancellata 
Nothotalisia peruviana 
Nothotalisia piranii

References

Picramniales
Rosid genera